Aluterus heudelotii, the dotterel filefish, is a filefish of the family Monacanthidae. It is found in the western Atlantic from northern Gulf of Mexico to Brazil, and in the eastern Atlantic from Senegal to southern Angola. This demersal species inhabits seagrass, sand or mud in shallow waters, typically between 10 and 100 m and occasionally down to 2000 m. It growth up to 45 cm, with a typical length of 30 cm, and feeds on plants such as algae and seagrasses.

References

Monacanthidae
Fish described in 1855